CAP/Ponsin protein, also known as Sorbin and SH3 domain-containing protein 1 is a protein that in humans is encoded by the SORBS1 gene. It is part of a small family of adaptor proteins that regulate cell adhesion, growth factor signaling and cytoskeletal formation. It is mainly expressed in heart, skeletal muscle, liver, adipose tissue, and macrophages; in striated muscle tissue, it is localized to costamere structures.

Structure
CAP/Ponsin may exist as thirteen alternatively-spliced isoforms, ranging from 81 kDa to 142 kDa. It is part of an adaptor protein family, of which ArgBP2 and vinexin are also a part. These proteins contain a conserved sorbin homology (SOHO) domain and three SH3 domains, and CAP/Ponsin is expressed in heart, skeletal muscle, liver, adipose tissue, and macrophages.

Function 
In muscle, CAP/Ponsin plays a role in the formation of mature costameres from focal adhesion-like contacts during assembly of the contractile apparatus, as overexpression of CAP/Ponsin disrupted normal cell-matrix contact morphology. In a mouse model of viral myocarditis due to Coxsackievirus infection, CAP/Ponsin stabilized antiviral type I interferon production and was protective against apoptosis and cytotoxicity. It has also been shown to be a major regulator of insulin-stimulated signaling and regulation of glucose uptake, by potentiating insulin-induced phosphorylation and recruitment of CBL to a lipid raft signaling complex involving flotillin. A role for it in macrophage function was illuminated by the finding that, in mice harboring SORBS1-deficient macrophages in bone marrow, it was protective against high-fat diet-induced insulin resistance and showed reduced inflammation. In non-muscle cells, it inhibits cell spreading and focal adhesion turnover, as its siRNA-mediated knockdown resulted in enhanced PAK/MEK/ERK activation and cell migration.

Clinical Significance
CAP/Ponsin was demonstrated to be down-regulated in end-stage heart failure patients; an effect that was restored upon mechanical unloading. A single nucleotide polymorphism in SORBS1 was found to be associated with type 2 diabetes and obesity.

Interactions 

SORBS1 has been shown to interact with:

 CBL,
 FLOT1, 
 INPPL1,
 INSM1, 
 MLLT4, 
 PXN, and
 Vinculin.

References

Further reading